Elvina may refer to:

Places
Elviña, Spain, town where the Battle of Corunna took place
Castro de Elviña, ruined site in Galicia, Spain
Elvina Bay, New South Wales, bay in northern Sydney, Australia

People
Elvina M. Hall (1818-1889), American songwriter
Elvina Pallavicini (1914-2004), Italian noblewoman
Elvina Ramella (1927-2007), Italian opera singer
Elvina Kong (born 1967), Hong Kong actress
Elvina Beck (born 1985), Russian entrepreneur
Elvina Vidot (born 1993), French paralympic athlete
Elvina Karimova (born 1994), Russian water polo player
Elvina Djaferova, Uzbekistani women's international footballer
Elvina Ibru, (born 1972), Nigerian actress